This is a list of conglomerates in Uganda. The conglomerates are listed in alphabetical order.

See also
 List of conglomerates
 List of conglomerates in Africa
 List of companies based in Uganda

References

Conglomerate companies of Uganda
conglomerates